Speleoharpactea is a monotypic genus of European woodlouse hunting spiders containing the single species, Speleoharpactea levantina. It was first described by C. Ribera in 1982, and has only been found in Spain.

References

Dysderidae
Monotypic Araneomorphae genera